"I'll Remember Tonight" is a song by Pat Boone from his musical film Mardi Gras.

It reached number 34 on the Bllboard Hot 100 in 1958.

Track listing

Charts

References 

1958 songs
1958 singles
Pat Boone songs
Dot Records singles